The 2017 Mutua Madrid Open was a professional tennis tournament played on outdoor clay courts at the Park Manzanares in Madrid, Spain from 5–14 May 2017. It was the 16th edition of the event on the ATP World Tour and 9th on the WTA Tour. It was classified as an ATP World Tour Masters 1000 event on the 2017 ATP World Tour and a Premier Mandatory event on the 2017 WTA Tour.

Points and prize money

Point distribution

Prize money

ATP singles main-draw entrants

Seeds
The following are the seeded players.  Seedings are based on ATP rankings as of 1 May 2017. Rankings and points before are as of 8 May 2017.

Because the tournament took place one week later than in 2016, the points defended from last year was not superseded within a 52-week run, the results during the 52-week period were from 2016 Italian Open.

Other entrants
The following players received wildcards into the main draw:
  Nicolás Almagro
  Marius Copil
  Guillermo García López
  Tommy Robredo

The following player received entry using a protected ranking:
  Tommy Haas

The following players received entry from the qualifying draw:
  Thomaz Bellucci
  Ernesto Escobedo 
  Pierre-Hugues Herbert
  Denis Istomin 
  Mikhail Kukushkin 
  Andrey Kuznetsov
  Adrian Mannarino

The following players received entry as lucky losers:
  Borna Ćorić
  Jared Donaldson

Withdrawals
Before the tournament
  Juan Martín del Potro →replaced by  Nicolas Mahut
  Roger Federer →replaced by  Ryan Harrison
  Richard Gasquet →replaced by  Borna Ćorić
  John Isner →replaced by  Robin Haase
  Steve Johnson →replaced by  Jared Donaldson
  Paolo Lorenzi →replaced by  Marcos Baghdatis
  Sam Querrey →replaced by  Florian Mayer
  Viktor Troicki →replaced by  Karen Khachanov

During the tournament
  Kei Nishikori
  Jo-Wilfried Tsonga

ATP doubles main-draw entrants

Seeds

Rankings are as of May 1, 2017.

Other entrants
The following pairs received wildcards into the doubles main draw:
  David Marrero /  Tommy Robredo 
  Fernando Verdasco /  Nenad Zimonjić

The following pairs received entry as alternates:
  Brian Baker /  Nicholas Monroe
  Juan Sebastián Cabal /  Robert Farah

Withdrawals
Before the tournament
  Pablo Carreño Busta
  Lucas Pouille

During the tournament
  Nick Kyrgios

WTA singles main-draw entrants

Seeds
The following are the seeded players. Seedings are based on WTA rankings as of 1 May 2017. Rankings and points before are as of 8 May 2017.

Because the tournament took place one week later than in 2016, the points defended from last year was not superseded within a 52-week run, the results during the 52-week period were from 2016 Italian Open.

Other entrants
The following players received wildcards into the main draw:
  Lara Arruabarrena
  Sorana Cîrstea
  Francesca Schiavone
  Maria Sharapova
  Sara Sorribes Tormo

The following players received entry from the qualifying draw:
  Océane Dodin
  Mariana Duque Mariño 
  Johanna Larsson
  Pauline Parmentier
  Andrea Petkovic
  Donna Vekić
  Wang Qiang 
  Zheng Saisai

The following player received entry as a lucky loser:
  Anett Kontaveit

Withdrawals
Before the tournament
  Petra Kvitová →replaced by  Viktorija Golubic
  Naomi Osaka →replaced by  Catherine Bellis
  Agnieszka Radwańska →replaced by  Anett Kontaveit
  Serena Williams →replaced by  Jelena Janković
  Venus Williams →replaced by  Eugenie Bouchard

Retirements
  Angelique Kerber
  Ana Konjuh

WTA doubles main-draw entrants

Seeds

Rankings are as of May 1, 2017.

Other entrants
The following pairs received wildcards into the doubles main draw:
  Lara Arruabarrena /  Sara Sorribes Tormo 
  Johanna Konta /  Shelby Rogers
  Arantxa Parra Santonja /  Sílvia Soler Espinosa

Champions

Men's singles
 
  Rafael Nadal def.  Dominic Thiem, 7–6(10–8), 6–4

Women's singles
 
  Simona Halep def.  Kristina Mladenovic, 7–5, 6–7(5–7), 6–2

Men's doubles
 
  Łukasz Kubot /  Marcelo Melo def.  Nicolas Mahut /  Édouard Roger-Vasselin, 7–5, 6–3

Women's doubles
 
  Chan Yung-jan /  Martina Hingis def.  Tímea Babos /  Andrea Hlaváčková, 6–4, 6–3

References

External links
 Official website